Danelle Tan Li Ern (born 25 October 2004) is a Singaporean women's football player.

Early life and education
Tan started playing football when she was 6 and joined her brothers at JSSL academy. She was proficient from a young age and scored 12 goals in her first session. Tan moved to London, England to study at Mill Hill School in 2022. Tan became the first Singaporean footballer to sign for a NCAA Division 1 team.

Club career
In 2019, Tan joined Still Aerion, an amateur women's team from the FAS Women's National League. Scoring on her debut match in May 2019 at the age of 14 made her the second-youngest goal scorer in the league's history. Tan scored 16 goals in 6 games and became the league's top scorer for the season. She also scored 4 goals in the Challenge Cup and helped the club to enter the finals where they lost 0–1 to Tanjong Pagar United FC. 

Tan then joined Lion City Sailors in 2020 but played no official matches due to the COVID-19 pandemic in Singapore. While studying at Mill Hill School in London, she was part of the school's First XI football team and was the first female footballer player in the team.

Tan made her debut for Lion City Sailors in July 2022 against Still Aerion FC. She scored two minutes after coming on in the second half and she scored again 14 minutes later.

Tan became the first female Singaporean to play in a European league when she came on as a substitute for London Bees in their 2–1 defeat by Plymouth Argyle.

International career
Tan made the Singapore U16 in 2017 at the age of 12. She scored her first goal for the under 16 team in September 2018 in a 4–1 win against Tajikistan. She registered her first hat-trick a few days later in a 4–0 win against Northern Mariana Islands.

She made her Singapore U19 debut on 24 October 2018 in a 0–8 loss against Jordan in the 2019 AFC U-19 Women's Championship qualification. She was the youngest player in the Singapore squad at the age of 13.

In a UEFA-FAS tournament in March 2019, she scored 4 goals against Guam and 1 against Cambodia, to be the joint top scorer in the tournament held in Singapore. She also received the Golden Boot of the UEFA Under-15 Tournament in 2019.

Tan was called up to the senior national team and made her debut on 16 August 2019 at the AFF Women's Championship. She scored a last-minute goal in the 1–2 defeat against Timor-Leste. She was 14 years, which made her the youngest goalscorer (male and female) in Singapore and the fifth youngest in the world.

In the 2022 FAS Tri-Nations series, Tan scored 2 goals and had 1 assist in a 6–2 win against Seychelles. She was also named as one of three best players in a 0–1 defeat against Papua New Guinea.

Personal life
Tan has been chosen to be an ambassador for women's football in Singapore and has been honoured by Edwin Tong, Singapore's Minister for Culture, Community and Youth and Second Minister for Law at the 2022 Women's Football Conference. Tan was cited as one of eight Singaporean women trailblazers.

Career statistics

International goals

References

External links
Instagram account

2004 births
Living people
Singaporean women's footballers
Singapore women's international footballers
Women's association football forwards
Singaporean sportspeople of Chinese descent